Mallosoma zonatum is a species of beetle in the family Cerambycidae. It was described by Sahlberg in 1823.

References

Heteropsini
Beetles described in 1823